Eugen Mühlberger (30 August 1902 – 1 August 1944 or 1943) was a German male weightlifter, who competed in the featherweight category and represented Germany at international competitions.  He won German national championships in 1925–27, 1929, 1930 and 1932.  He competed at the 1928 Summer Olympics. Mühlberger set the world record in the featherweight category in the snatch, lifting 93 kg on March 18, 1929 in Hamburg. He won the European Weightlifting Championships in 1930, placed second the following year, held the world record in his division in 1931, but did not attend the 1932 Olympic games held in Los Angeles.

Mühlberger died during the Second World War in August 1944 having been missing in action while fighting on the eastern front in the Soviet Union.

References

External links
 

1944 deaths
Weightlifters at the 1928 Summer Olympics
Sportspeople from Ludwigshafen
World record setters in weightlifting
1902 births
German male weightlifters
Olympic weightlifters of Germany
Place of death unknown
German military personnel killed in World War II
Missing in action of World War II